Between Two Fires may refer to:

 "Between Two Fires" (song), a 1984 song by Gary Morris
 Between Two Fires (album), a 1986 album by Paul Young
 Between Two Fires (novel), a 2012 novel by Christopher Buehlman
 "Between Two Fires" (Outlander)
 "Between Two Fires" (Stargate SG-1)